Philip Mullington (born 25 September 1956) is a former English  footballer who played as a  midfielder.

Career 
Having begun his career at Oldham Athletic, Mullington signed for Rochdale in December 1975 and went on to play 73 times for the club in all competitions scoring 13 goals. His best remembered goal for the club was probably the one scored on 3 January 1976 which earned Dale an FA Cup Third Round replay at home to then First Division Norwich City after a 1-1 draw at Carrow Road.

Released at the end of the 1976/77 season, he was signed by Dick Bate for Mossley from Northwich Victoria in October 1977. Spells at Crewe Alexandra before a return to Rochdale in August 1978. Mullington later played in Hong Kong and Ireland.

According to the Football League Paper, he "had a spell working as a showbiz agent for singer Wayne Fontana". Mullington, who now has an impressive property portfolio, spends his time between his home in Essex and his overseas property in Mallorca.

References

1956 births
Living people
English footballers
Association football defenders
Rochdale A.F.C. players
Crewe Alexandra F.C. players
Sligo Rovers F.C. players
English Football League players